= Eurymeloides pulchra =

Scientific classification
- Kingdom: Animalia
- Phylum: Arthropoda
- Clade: Pancrustacea
- Class: Insecta
- Order: Hemiptera
- Suborder: Auchenorrhyncha
- Family: Cicadellidae
- Genus: Eurymeloides
- Species: E. pulchra

Binomial name
- Eurymeloides pulchra (Signoret, 1850)

Species of hopper

Eurymeloides pulchra, commonly known as the green gum leafhopper or gumtree hopper, is a species of leaf hopper in the family Cicadellidae.

== Description ==
E. pulchra grows to about 1 cm in length. Adults are black; with two transverse white lines on the wings, the first of which is often fragmented. The hind leg is wedge-shaped, and the eyes are orange. The scutellum has a noticeable orange-brown V-shape, while the abdomen is green.

The adult of E. pulchra.
